Chakraborty is a surname of Bengali Hindus of India and Bangladesh, the surname is used by people of the Bengali Brahmin community.

Notable persons with this surname

Male
Ajay Chakraborty (born 1943), Indian politician
Ajoy Chakrabarty (born 1953), Indian singer
Akinchan Chakrabarty (18th century), Bengali poet
Amal Chakraborty, Indian paediatric surgeon
Ambika Chakrabarty (1892–1962), Indian Bengali independence movement activist and revolutionary
Amiya Chakravarty (1901–1986), literary critic, academic, and Bengali poet
Amiya Chakravarty (1912-1957), Indian film director, screenwriter and producer
Ananda Mohan Chakrabarty (1938 - 2020), Indian microbiologist, party to the U.S. Supreme Court case Diamond v. Chakrabarty
Animesh Chakravorty (born 1935), Indian chemist
Aravinda Chakravarti (born 1954), Indian geneticist
Arindam Chakrabarti, Indian philosopher working in Hawaii
Arjun Chakrabarty, Indian actor
Arnab Chakrabarty (born 1980), Indian musician and Sarod player
Arup Chakraborty, American engineer
Bicky Chakraborty (born 1943), Swedish hotel mogul
Bikas K Chakrabarti (born 1952), Indian physicist
Birendra Narayan Chakraborty (1904–1976), Indian politician
Bonnie Chakraborty, Bengali singer
Byomkes Chakrabarti (1923–1981), Indian linguist
Chiranjeet Chakraborty (born 1960), Indian Bengali film actor
Dhirendra Kishore Chakravarti (1902after 1982), Indian geologist and palaeontologist
Dilip Kumar Chakrabarti, Indian archaeologist
Dipesh Chakrabarty (born 1948), Indian historian
Gaurav Chakrabarty (born 1987), Indian actor
Ghanaram Chakrabarty (c. 1669-?), Bengali poet
Haranath Chakraborty (born 1959), Indian Bengali film director
J. D. Chakravarthy (born 1970), Indian film actor and director in Telugu cinema and Bollywood
Janardan Chakravarti (1901-1987), Indian professor of Bengali
K. Chakravarthy (1936–2002), music director in the South Indian film industry
Keshab Chakravarthy (active 1925), Indian revolutionary
Khelaram Chakrabarty (16th century), Bengali poet
Kshitindra Mohan Chakravarty (1900-1988), Indian chemist, fuel technician and teacher
Kushal Chakraborty (born 1968), Bengali actor and film director
M. C. Chakrabarti (died 1972), Indian statistician
Mahaakshay Chakraborty (born 1984), Indian actor
Manoj Chakraborty (born 1954), Indian politician
Mithun Chakraborty (born 1950), Indian actor, director and businessman
Nachiketa Chakraborty (born 1965), Indian Bengali singer-songwriter
Nirendranath Chakravarty (1924 - 2018), Bengali poet
Nripen Chakraborty (1905–2004), Indian politician
Oliphant Chuckerbutty (1884–1960), English composer and organist of Anglo-Indian descent
Panchanan Chakraborty (1900–1995), Indian revolutionary
Phani Bhusan Chakravartti (1898–1981), first Indian Bengali permanent Chief Justice of the Calcutta High Court.
Pramod Chakravorty (1929–2004), Indian film director and producer
Praveen Chakravarty (born 1973), Indian businessman
Pritam Chakraborty (born 1971), Indian Bengali music director and composer
Pritish Chakraborty Indian film actor, director, writer, producer, singer in Bollywood
Rahi Chakraborty (born 1988), Indian singer, songwriter, programmer and guitarist
Raj Chakraborty (born 1975), Indian Bengali film director
Rajorshi Chakraborti (born 1977), Indian writer in English
Ranajit Chakraborty, Indian geneticist
Ritwick Chakraborty, Actor
Rupram Chakrabarty (17th century), Bengali poet
S. S. Chakravarthy, Indian Tamil film producer
Sabyasachi Chakrabarty, (born 1956), Indian Bengali TV and film actor
Saikat Chakrabarti, American computer programmer, entrepreneur, and political activist
Samiran Chandra Chakrabarti Indian Indologist and scholar of onomastics & Vedic studies
Samrat Chakrabarti (born 1975), British-American actor and musician
Sandip Chakrabarti (born 1958), Indian astrophysicist
Sankar Chakraborti (born 1970), Indian business leader
Shibram Chakraborty (1903–1980), Bengali writer, humorist and revolutionary
Shibu Chakravarthy (born 1961), lyricist, screenplay and script writer who mainly works in Malayalam Cinema
Shyam Sundar Chakravarthy (1869–1932), Bengali revolutionary, independence activist and journalist
Snehasish Chakraborty (born 1989), Indian footballer
Soham Chakraborty, Actor
Soorjo Coomar Goodeve Chuckerbutty (ca 1826–1874), one of the earliest Indians to practice modern medicine
Sourav Chakraborty (born 1992), Indian footballer
Souvik Chakraborty (born 1991), Indian footballer
Subhas Chakraborty Indian politician, former minister of West Bengal Legislative Assembly. Died in 2009. Member of Communist Party of India Marxist and also former transport minister of West Bengal 
Sugato Chakravarty Indian marketing academic
Sujan Chakraborty (born 1959), Indian politician
Sujit Chakravarty (born 1959), Indian football manager
Suma Chakrabarti (born 1959), British civil servant, President of the European Bank for Reconstruction and Development
Sumon K Chakrabarti, Indian journalist
Swadesh Chakraborty (born 1943), Indian politician
Swapan Kumar Chakravorty (1954 - 2021) Director General of the National Library of India, Kolkata
Trailokyanath Chakravarty (1889–1970), Indian revolutionary
Tulsi Chakraborty (1899–1961), Indian comic actor
Utpalendu Chakrabarty (born 1948), Indian film director
Varun Chakravarthy, Cricketer
Vijay C Chakravarthy Indian cinematographer
Vinayak Chakravorty Indian film critic and film journalist
Vinu Chakravarthy (1945 - 2017) Tamil actor, script writer and director
Visvanatha Chakravarti (1626? - 1708?) Bengali guru

Female
Bijoya Chakravarty (born 1939), Indian politician from Assam
Dia Chakravarty (born 1984), Bangladeshi-born British political activist and singer
Gayatri Chakravorty Spivak (born 1942), Indian literary critic
Ipsita Roy Chakraverti (born 1950), Indian Wiccan priestess
Kaushiki Chakrabarty (born 1980), Indian classical vocalist
Lolita Chakrabarti (born 1969), British actor and writer
Meghna Chakrabarti, American radio personality
Mimi Chakraborty (born 1989), Bengali film actress, singer and a (nominal) Member of Parliament
Reeta Chakrabarti (born 1964), British television journalist
Rhea Chakraborty (born 1992), Indian video jockey and actress
Ritabhari Chakraborty (born 1992), Indian Bengali film actor
Rushmi Chakravarthi (born 1977), Indian tennis player
Shami Chakrabarti (born 1969), British member of the House of Lords, barrister and civil liberties campaigner
Sharmila Chakraborty (born 1961), Indian cricketer
Sumona Chakravarti, Bollywood actress and celebrity
Uthpala Chakraborty, Indian cricketer.
S. A. Chakraborty, (born 1985), American fantasy novelist

See also 
 Chakrabarti Inquiry, British Labour Party inquiry into allegations of antisemitism
 Chakravartin, an ancient Indian term used to refer to an ideal universal ruler
 Chakravartin Ashoka Samrat, a 2015 Indian historical drama TV series

References

Hindu surnames
Surnames of Indian origin
Bengali Hindu surnames
Assamese-language surnames